Discodermia  is a genus of deep-water sea sponge.

Species 
The following species are accepted within Discodermia:

 Discodermia adhaerens Van Soest, Meesters & Becking, 2014
 Discodermia arbor Carvalho & Xavier, 2020
 Discodermia aspera Carter, 1880
 Discodermia calyx Döderlein, 1884
 Discodermia claviformis Kieschnick, 1896
 Discodermia discifera  (Lendenfeld, 1907) 
 Discodermia discifurca Sollas, 1888
 Discodermia dissoluta Schmidt, 1880
 Discodermia dubia Vacelet & Vasseur, 1971
 Discodermia emarginata Dendy, 1905
 Discodermia gorgonoides Burton, 1928
 Discodermia inscripta  (Schmidt, 1879) 
 Discodermia interspersa Kumar, 1925
 Discodermia irregularis Hoshino, 1976
 Discodermia japonica Döderlein, 1884
 Discodermia jogashima Tanita & Hoshino, 1989
 Discodermia kellyae Carvalho & Xavier, 2020
 Discodermia kiiensis Hoshino, 1977
 Discodermia koreana Sim, 1982
 Discodermia laevidiscus Carter, 1880
 Discodermia natalensis Kirkpatrick, 1903
 Discodermia ornata Sollas, 1888
 Discodermia panoplia Sollas, 1888
 Discodermia papillata Carter, 1880
 Discodermia polydiscus  (Bowerbank, 1869) 
 Discodermia polymorpha Pisera & Vacelet, 2011
 Discodermia proliferans Lévi & Lévi, 1983
 Discodermia ramifera Topsent, 1892
 Discodermia sinuosa Carter, 1881
 Discodermia stylifera Keller, 1891
 Discodermia tuberosa Dendy, 1922
 Discodermia vermicularis Döderlein, 1884
 Discodermia verrucosa Topsent, 1928

Pharmacology 

D. dissoluta is of interest to bio and organic chemists because it produces (+)-discodermolide, a polyketide natural product with immunosuppressive and cancer killing properties.

Antimicrobial/anticancer peptides called discodermins have been isolated from D. kiiensis.

References 

Tetractinellida
Sponges described in 1869
Sponge genera